World Without End is the second album by The Mighty Lemon Drops, released in 1988. It reached #34 on the UK Album Chart. The album contains their hit single "Inside Out," which reached #74 on the UK Singles Chart.

Production
The album was produced and mixed by Tim Palmer, and recorded at Rockfield Studios in Wales and Utopia Studios in London.

Critical reception
AllMusic wrote that the album "is one of the finest British post-punk albums of the '80s. Its parts may be borrowed, but it runs like a well-oiled machine." The Washington Post called it "galloping power-pop, tuneful and fresh," yet also, like all of the band's previous albums, overly indebted to the work of The Teardrop Explodes. Trouser Press wrote that World Without End "is a more mature, sophisticated and individualized effort, but Paul Marsh still sings as if he’s trying to impress either Ian McCulloch or Jim Morrison."

The Los Angeles Times called "Inside Out" "a perfect smart-pop single."

Track listing
All songs written by David Newton and Tony Linehan.

Side One
Inside Out - 3:18
One By One - 3:30
In Everything You Do - 5:07
Hear Me Call - 4:17
No Bounds - 4:55

Side Two
Fall Down (Like the Rain) - 3:52
Crystal Clear - 4:36
Hollow Inside - 4:10
Closer to You - 4:54
Breaking Down - 3:42
Shine - 3:33

Personnel 
The Mighty Lemon Drops
Paul Marsh - vocals
David Newton - guitars
Tony Linehan - bass
Keith Rowley - percussion

References 

1988 albums
Sire Records albums
The Mighty Lemon Drops albums
Albums produced by Tim Palmer